Allan Richard Michaelsen (2 November 1947 – 2 March 2016) was a Danish football player and manager. He was voted Danish Football Player of the Year in 1969. He was the father of Jan Michaelsen.

References

External links
 Danish national team profile 
 

1947 births
2016 deaths
Danish expatriate men's footballers
Expatriate footballers in France
Expatriate footballers in Germany
Danish men's footballers
Denmark international footballers
SfB-Oure FA players
FC Nantes players
Ligue 1 players
Eintracht Braunschweig players
Bundesliga players
FC Chiasso players
Association football midfielders
Danish football managers
Næstved Boldklub managers
Esbjerg fB managers
Vejle Boldklub managers
Akademisk Boldklub managers
Boldklubben 1909 managers
Danish 1st Division managers
Footballers from Copenhagen